A total solar eclipse occurred at the Moon’s descending node of the orbit on Thursday, July 11, 1991. A solar eclipse occurs when the Moon passes between Earth and the Sun, thereby totally or partly obscuring the image of the Sun for a viewer on Earth. A total solar eclipse occurs when the Moon's apparent diameter is larger than the Sun's, blocking all direct sunlight, turning day into darkness. Totality occurs in a narrow path across Earth's surface, with the partial solar eclipse visible over a surrounding region thousands of kilometres wide.
Totality began over the Pacific Ocean and Hawaii moving across Mexico, down through Central America and across South America ending over Brazil. It lasted for 6 minutes and 53.08 seconds at the point of maximum eclipse. There will not be a longer total eclipse until June 13, 2132. This was the largest total solar eclipse of Solar Saros series 136, because eclipse magnitude was 1.07997.

This eclipse was the most central total eclipse in 800 years, with a gamma of -.0041. There will not be a more central eclipse for another 800 years. Its magnitude was also greater than any eclipse since the 6th century.

Observations

Related eclipses

Eclipses of 1991 
 An annular solar eclipse on January 15.
 A penumbral lunar eclipse on January 30.
 A penumbral lunar eclipse on June 27.
 A total solar eclipse on July 11.
 A penumbral lunar eclipse on July 26.
 A partial lunar eclipse on December 21.

Solar eclipses 1990–1992

This eclipse is the center of seven central solar eclipses.

Saros 136

Inex series

Tritos series

Metonic series

Notes

References
 NASA graphics
 Google interactive map of the eclipse from NASA
 NASA Besselian Elements - Total Solar Eclipse of July 11, 1991
 Observer's handbook 1991, Editor Roy L. Bishop, The Royal Astronomical Society of Canada (p. 101)

Photos:
 Russian scientist observed eclipse
 Russia expedition
 Baja California, La Paz. Prof. Druckmüller's eclipse photography site
 Baja California, Todos Santos. Prof. Druckmüller's eclipse photography site
 Reyna from La Paz, Baja California, Mexico
 www.noao.edu: Satellite view of eclipse
  APOD 7/16/1999, Solar Surfin', total eclipse corona, from Mauna Kea, Hawaii
  APOD 10/24/1995, A Total Solar Eclipse, total eclipse corona
 The 1991 Eclipse in Mexico

Videos:
 Total Solar Eclipse -- July 11, 1991 (9:39 uncut, eclipse full frame, location insert)
 Total Solar Eclipse (8:23 edited, includes pre-planning and post-press, music only)
 Total Solar Eclipse, Cabo Mexico (9:12 edited, includes some TV news coverage)

1991 07 11
1991 07 11
1991 in science
July 1991 events
1991 in Mexico
1991 in Guatemala
1991 in El Salvador
1991 in Honduras
1991 in Nicaragua
1991 in Costa Rica
1991 in Panama
1991 in Colombia
1991 in Brazil